Krasnokamensk is a town and the administrative center of Krasnokamensky District in Zabaykalsky Krai, Russia, located near the Sino-Russian border,  southeast of Chita, the administrative center of the krai. It is best known as the site for Russia's largest uranium mine. Population:

Etymology
The name translates roughly as town on red stone, with the reference to the color red reflecting both the actual rock formations in the area, as well as its political symbolism in the Soviet era.

History
It was founded in 1968, in conjunction with the commencement of mining of the Streltsovskoye uranium deposits, which had been discovered near the present site of the city in 1963. The settlement grew quickly and was granted town status in 1969.

From October 2005 until December 2006, Mikhail Khodorkovsky was jailed in Krasnokamensk on his conviction for tax evasion and fraud.

Administrative and municipal status
Within the framework of administrative divisions, Krasnokamensk serves as the administrative center of Krasnokamensky District, to which it is directly subordinated. As a municipal division, the town of Krasnokamensk, together with one rural locality (the settlement of Oktyabrsky), is incorporated within Krasnokamensky Municipal District as Krasnokamensk Urban Settlement.

Economy
The town is best known for its uranium mine – Priargunsky mine – the largest in Russia, located 10–20 km from Krasnokamensk. Priargunsky represents one of the largest uranium reserves in Russia having estimated reserves of 71.9 million tonnes of ore grading 0.16% uranium.

The full name of the complex is the Priargunsky Mining-Chemical Production Association (PPGHO), which consists of a uranium mines, processing mills and tailings as well as a lignite mine and power plant along with a manganese casting plant and mill.

In 1995, 5 million pounds of uranium were produced.
In 1996, it was reported that over the previous 17 years, 10 km of stream bed had been contaminated with radiation levels of 170 microroentgen/hr, 10 times the world-wide average.
In 1998 it was reported that the area produced 2,470 tonnes of uranium contained in ore and that over the lifetime of the mine, more than 100,000 tonnes had been mined.
In 1998 and 2002 it was reported that this location was the only active uranium production location in Russia during the previous decades.
In 2001, it was reported the area was once the world's largest uranium mining and processing center and in 2001 it was the world's fifth largest.
In 2001, it was reported that the uranium deposit could be depleted by 2026. In 2006, the area produced 2900 tonnes of uranium, which made it the fourth largest producer with 7% of the total world production.

Molybdenum is also mined in the town's vicinity, with associated chemical plants producing sulfuric acid and lubricants.

Pollution
According to the Blacksmith Institute, Krasnokamensk has generated fifty to seventy-five million tons of tailings, making it the largest waste stream at a uranium production site in the world. A Baley community survey documents hundreds of homes with radiation levels as much as 10–20 times the permissible levels. About 500–1000 homes or more suffer from radiation exposures far above international standards.

In recent years, the dangerously high levels of radioactivity led to evacuation and resettlement of residents living near the tailing dumps.

Transport
A branch railway has connected the town to Russia's rail network since 1972. Krasnokamensk is served by the Krasnokamensk Airport.

Climate
Despite its relatively southerly latitude in Siberia, Krasnokamensk has a monsoon influenced subarctic climate (Köppen climate classification Dwc), bordering very closely on a humid continental climate (Dwb). The summers are short but very warm whereas winters are severely cold. Precipitation is heavily concentrated in the warmest months.

Sister city
Manzhouli, China

References

Sources

External links 
 

Cities and towns in Zabaykalsky Krai
Cities and towns built in the Soviet Union
1968 establishments in the Soviet Union
Populated places established in 1968